The Oregon Department of Consumer and Business Services (DCBS) is the agency of the government of the U.S. state of Oregon, which has wide-ranging regulatory and consumer-protection authority in Oregon.  It administers laws and rules governing workers' compensation benefits, workplace safety and health, building codes, and the operation of both insurance companies and financial institutions.

The department provides services to both citizens and businesses, and as of 2006, had a budget of US$560 million, and employed a staff of 1,088.

Divisions
 Building Codes
 Division of Financial Regulation
 Oregon Health Insurance Marketplace
 Oregon Senior Health Insurance Benefits Assistance Program
 Occupational Safety and Health
 Workers' Compensation

Independent professional licensing and regulatory agencies 
In addition to licensing and regulating a vast array of professions, industries and trades directly, DCBS provides administrative support services to the state's several independent boards and commissions which have jurisdiction over particular professions or trades.  It publishes guides and a website to assist business owners and professionals in determining and meeting licensing and regulatory requirements, whether or not under the direct jurisdiction of the department.

Accountants
Aircraft pilots and landing site operators:See Oregon Department of Aviation
Appraisers
Architects:See Oregon Board of Architect Examiners
Athletic trainers
Attorneys
Body piercing
Chiropractors
Clinical Social Workers
Cosmetologists, Barbers & Beauticians
Counselors and Therapists
Dentists
Denturists
Dietitians
Electrologists, colorists and tattoo artists
Engineers and surveyors
Geologists:See Oregon State Board of Geologist Examiners
Investigators
Landscape architects
Landscape contractors
Massage therapists
Midwives
Morticians & cemetery operators
Naturopaths
Nurses & Nurse practitioners
Nursing home administrators
Occupational therapists
Optometrists
Pharmacists
Physical therapists
Physicians & physician assistants:See Oregon Medical Board
Psychologists
Racing
Radiologic Technologists: The Oregon Board of Radiologic Technologists is responsible for the licensing of Radiologic Technologists within the State of Oregon.  Licensing options include permanent licenses, permanent limited licenses, temporary licenses and temporary limited licenses.
Speech therapists and audiologists
Tax practitioners
Teachers
Veterinarians

References

External links
 Official website

Consumer And Business Services
Bank regulation in the United States by state
State departments of commerce of the United States